The Greek Ship is the nickname of a cargo steamship, Khoula F, that has been beached on the southwest coast of Kish Island, Iran, since 1966. She was built in 1943 by the British shipyard of William Hamilton and Company in Port Glasgow, Scotland, under the name Empire Trumpet. From 1946 to 1966, she passed through a series of British and Iranian owners and various changes of name. Her final owners were Greek, and the nickname given to her derives from them.

Propulsion
The engine was built by David Rowan & Co Ltd of Glasgow.

Career

Empire Trumpet first owner was the British Ministry of War Transport, which placed her under the management of Larrinaga Steam Ship Co from 1943 and then T&J Harrison Co from 1945. She was chartered to the South African Government from 1943 to 1946. In 1946, Charente Steam Ship Co bought the ship, renamed her Naturalist, and continued the management arrangement with T&J Harrison.

In 1959, Iranian Lloyd & Co Ltd of Khorramshahr bought the ship and renamed her Persian Cyrus. Iranian Lloyd placed Persian Cyrus under the management of B Ashworth and Co. (Overseas) Ltd of London. In 1965, Iranian Shipping Lines SA of Khorramshahr bought the ship and renamed her Hamadan. In 1966, P.J. Frangoulis and A.I. Cliafas of Greece bought the ship and renamed her Koula F.

Wreck

On July 25, 1966, Koula F ran aground on the south-western coast of Kish in the Persian Gulf. The Dutch salvage tug Orinoco tried to refloat the ship but was unsuccessful. The insurers declared Khoula F a total loss and she has remained beached ever since. The ship's condition has deteriorated and her stern has started to break up.

Tourist attraction
In Kish Island, the ship attracts tourists who come to view her at sunset.

References

1943 ships
Ships built on the River Clyde
Kish Island
Maritime incidents in 1966
Ships of Iran
Shipwrecks in the Persian Gulf
Steamships of Greece
Steamships of the United Kingdom
Buildings and structures in Hormozgan Province
1943 establishments in Scotland
1966 in Iran